Operation Chopper occurred on 12 January 1962 and was the first time U.S. forces participated in major combat in the Vietnam War.

Background
On 11 December 1961, the USS Core (T-AKV-41) docked in Saigon with 32 U.S. Army Piasecki H-21 helicopters and 400 crewmen of the 8th Transportation Company (Light Helicopter) and the 57th Transportation Company (Light Helicopter). A little more than 12 days later, Operation Chopper commenced.

Operation
The VC were surprised and soundly defeated.

Aftermath
This operation heralded a new era of air mobility for the U.S. Army, which had been slowly growing as a concept since the Army formed twelve helicopter battalions in 1952 as a result of the Korean War. These new battalions eventually formed a sort of modern-day cavalry for the Army.

On 15 April 1962 the United States Marine Corps began Operation Shufly, the rotating deployment of Marine helicopter squadrons, associated maintenance units and air traffic control detachments to South Vietnam to improve the mobility of ARVN forces.

References

Battles and operations of the Vietnam War
Battles of the Vietnam War involving the United States
Battles and operations of the Vietnam War in 1962
History of Ho Chi Minh City